Julián Souto Cueto (born 1 October 1992) is an Argentine handball player for Albatro Siracusa and the Argentine national team.

He participated at the 2017 World Men's Handball Championship.

Titles
Pan American Men's Club Handball Championship:
2017

Individual Achiviements
Top scorer:
2015 Pan American Men's Club Handball Championship
MVP:
2015 Pan American Men's Club Handball Championship
All star team: Playmaker:
2016 Pan American Men's Club Handball Championship

References

1992 births
Living people
Argentine male handball players
Expatriate handball players
Argentine expatriate sportspeople in Brazil
South American Games silver medalists for Argentina
South American Games medalists in handball
Competitors at the 2018 South American Games
21st-century Argentine people